Quintette may refer to:

Quintette, California
Quintette du Hot Club de France

See also
Quintet (disambiguation)